is a railway station in the city of Ōgaki, Gifu Prefecture, Japan, shared by Central Japan Railway Company (JR Central) and the private railway operators Tarumi Railway and Yōrō Railway.

Lines
Ōgaki Station is served by the following lines.
Tōkaidō Main Line
Tokaido Main Line (Mino-Akasaka Branch Line)
Tarumi Railway Tarumi Line
Yōrō Line

JR Central, Tarumi Railway

Layout
JR Ōgaki Station has three ground-level island platforms and one ground-level side platform serving a total of seven tracks. The station has a Midori no Madoguchi staffed ticket office.

Adjacent stations

History
JR Ōgaki Station opened on 25 May 1884.

Station numbering was introduced to the section of the Tōkaidō Line operated JR Central in March 2018; Ōgaki Station was assigned station number CA77.

Passenger statistics
In fiscal 2016, the station was used by an average of 17,046 passengers daily (boarding passengers only).

Ōgaki Dash
At Ōgaki Station, the overnight rapid train Moonlight Nagara terminates here. It is a rather popular service among Seishun 18 Ticket holders, who often use it for long distance travelling, so after getting off the Moonlight Nagara, these Ticket holders would change for other trains heading further towards different locations. Here at Ōgaki Station, the interchange window between the Moonlight Nagara (5:50 Arrival) and a Maibara-bound local train (5:53 Departure) is merely 3 minutes, which is so short that interchanging passengers often have to dash up the stairs, across the overpass towards the opposite platform, run down the stairs again, just so they can board the local train as soon as possible, to secure a seat after the exhausting journey on the Moonlight Nagara. This is dubbed as the Ōgaki Dash (大垣ダッシュ). For 18 Ticket holders, interchange windows can be so tight that the Ōgaki Dash is inevitable. Some passengers even specifically picked particular seats on board the Moonlight Nagara, just so they can get off the train at the nearest exit to the stairs. JR Central, in response to the Ōgaki Dash, has put up signs that warn passenger not to run.

Yōrō Railway

Layout
The Yōrō Railway station has a single bay platform serving two tracks. The station is attended.

Adjacent stations

History
The Yōrō Railway station opened on 31 July 1913.

Passenger statistics
In fiscal 2015, the Yōrō Railway station was used by an average of 7687 passengers daily (boarding passengers only).

Surrounding area

Ōgaki City Hall
Ōgaki Castle

See also
 List of railway stations in Japan

References

External links

 JR Central station information 

Railway stations in Japan opened in 1913
Railway stations in Gifu Prefecture
Railway stations in Japan opened in 1884
Stations of Yōrō Railway
Ōgaki